Hadewych, O.Praem., ( – 14 April) a.k.a. Hadewig or Hedwig, was abbess of the Premonstratensian monastery of Meer, (now part of Meerbusch) in modern North Rhine-Westphalia, Germany.

Life
Hadewych was the daughter of Count Lothair of Meer and St. Hildegund. Her brother was Hermann Joseph. After her father's death, she accompanied her mother on a pilgrimage to Rome. Upon their return, about 1178, they both took religious vows as nuns and converted the family castle into a monastery. Hadewych became part of the community founded by her mother. She succeeded her mother as abbess in 1183.

Hadewych died on April 14, about the year 1200; devotion to her quickly spread among the Norbertine community. She, as well as her mother and her brother, are counted among the Blessed.

References

1150 births
1200 deaths
Year of birth uncertain
German beatified people
Premonstratensian nuns
13th-century venerated Christians
12th-century German nuns